Orca Air was a regional airline based in Cairo in Egypt which also provided air taxi and charter services. It was established in February 1996 and is a member of the European Regions Airline Association (ERA). It also provided air ambulance services. After suspending operations in 2003, the airline has yet to recommence operations.

Short History

Orca Air was first founded in 1996 by Diaa El-Gabbani and Osama Farid and was the first air taxi service in the Middle East. But due to unexpected events such as the death of El-Gabbani in an air crash in 2000, then a slump in the tourism industry after September 11, 2001 and inadequate management, Orca Air's operations were suspended in 2003.

Code data

IATA Code: 4D
ICAO Code: ORK
Callsign: ORCA TAXI

Fleet
Initially the fleet was:

2 - DHC-8-300
2 - Metro 23s
1 - Beechcraft C-90B

References

	

Defunct airlines of Egypt
Airlines established in 1996
Airlines disestablished in 2003
2003 disestablishments in Egypt
Egyptian companies established in 1996